Sir Geoffrey Edwin Pattie (born 17 January 1936) is a British former Conservative politician and Member of Parliament. 

Pattie was educated at Durham School, and St Catharine's College, Cambridge where he obtained an MA Honours Degree in Law  and was later made an Honorary Fellow of the College. He then joined the army, becoming a captain in the Royal Green Jackets. Pattie was chairman of the controversial company SCL Group, the parent company of Cambridge Analytica, and that offered "psychological warfare" services aimed at influencing elections.

Military service
From 1959 through 1966, he served with the Queen's Royal Rifles and achieved the rank of captain. He served as honorary colonel of the 4th Battalion, Royal Green Jackets since January 1996.

Business
Pattie was a director at advertising agency Collett Dickenson Pearce from 1966 until 1979, as managing director from 1969 to 1973. 

During the 1990s he held several senior marketing positions in companies belonging to General Electric Company, including Marconi Defence Systems and was Marketing Director of the group itself from 1997–99. Pattie was the founding Chairman of Strategic Communications Laboratories where he was also Director until he resigned from that position in 2008; the company offered "psychological warfare" services aimed at influencing elections, and later became known to a wider audience as a result of the Facebook–Cambridge Analytica data scandal involving its subsidiary. He was senior partner at Terrington Management retiring in December 2015.

Public and political service

Greater London Council 
In 1967 Pattie was elected to the Greater London Council as one of four councillors representing the London Borough of Lambeth. He served a single three-year term, stepping down in 1970.

Member of Parliament 
After being beaten by Labour's Tom Driberg at Barking in 1966 and 1970, Pattie was elected as Member of Parliament for Chertsey and Walton in February 1974 – a seat he held until his retirement in May 1997.

Ministerial Office 

In May 1979, he was appointed Parliamentary Under Secretary of State for Defence (RAF). From January 1983 until September 1984 he was then appointed to Parliamentary Under Secretary of State for Defence Procurement and then served as Minister of State for Defence Procurement. He continued his public service as Minister of State for Industry until 1987, with responsibility for Science,
Civil Aviation, Space and Technology. During his time in office he was actively involved in the initiation of a number of national and international technology projects. These included the Alvey Programme, which ceased when he left office after the 1987 General Election, and several projects of the European Commission, such as Eureka and ESPRIT.  

He was appointed to the Privy Council in the 1987 New Year Honours.

Immediately after he left ministerial office he was created Knight Bachelor in the 1987 Birthday Honours List.

He was vice-chairman of the Conservative Party in 1990.

Awards
 In 1987, Pattie was appointed Knight Bachelor.
 Pattie was awarded the Silver Star Award from by the International Strategic Studies Association for Outstanding Contributions to Strategic Progress.
 He was elected an Honorary Fellow of St Catharine's College, Cambridge in 2007.

Religion
Pattie is a practising Anglican and was a member of the General Synod of the Church of England from 1970–75.

References

External links
Sir Geoffrey Pattie  was awarded the Silver Star Award from by the International Strategic Studies Association
Sir Geoffrey Pattie Biography

Knights Bachelor
1936 births
Living people
Members of the Order of the British Empire
Conservative Party (UK) MPs for English constituencies
Royal Green Jackets officers
UK MPs 1974
UK MPs 1974–1979
UK MPs 1979–1983
UK MPs 1983–1987
UK MPs 1987–1992
UK MPs 1992–1997
Members of the Privy Council of the United Kingdom
Alumni of St Catharine's College, Cambridge
People educated at Durham School
Members of the Greater London Council